The Jiuyang Zhenjing, also known as the Nine Yang Manual, is a fictional martial arts manual in Jin Yong's Condor Trilogy. It was first introduced briefly at the end of the second novel The Return of the Condor Heroes. It plays a significant role in the third novel The Heaven Sword and Dragon Saber after Zhang Wuji discovers it and masters the skills in the book.

Origin
The manual's origin is disputed, as opposed to that of its counterpart Nine Yin Manual. Rumours in the Shaolin School say that the manual was written by Bodhidharma, the founder of the Shaolin School, since it was discovered as being written between the lines of the Lankavatara Sutra, one of many Buddhist scriptures in the Shaolin library. However, these claims have never been verified and the manual could not have been written by Bodhidharma since the lines were written in Chinese. Zhang Sanfeng, the founder of the Wudang School, believes that the manual has connections to Taoism despite the popular belief that it has its origins in Buddhism. The Nine Yang Manual is also never published as a single book, in contrast to the Nine Yin Manual, which comes in two volumes.

The manual's origin was later retconned in the revised latest edition of The Heaven Sword and Dragon Saber. In this edition, the Nine Yang Manual was created as a yang counterpart to the yin energy of the Nine Yin Manual.

The Return of the Condor Heroes
The manual's existence is not known to the jianghu until it was stolen by Yinkexi and Xiaoxiangzi at the end of The Return of the Condor Heroes. The Shaolin librarian Jueyuan and his young apprentice Zhang Junbao pursued the thieves to Mount Hua to retrieve the stolen book. They encountered the new Five Greats (Huang Yaoshi, Yang Guo, Guo Jing, Yideng and Zhou Botong), who were just departing from the summit after paying their respects to the late Hong Qigong and Ouyang Feng.

Zhang Junbao defeated Yinkexi and Xiaoxiangzi with Yang Guo's help but had not found the missing book yet. In fact, Yinkexi had already hidden the manual in the abdomen of a white gorilla. He and Xiaoxiangzi later suspected that each other was intending to keep the manual for himself. They fought to seize possession of the book and ultimately Yinkexi killed Xiaoxiangzi but he was also fatally wounded and remained in a moribund state. Yinkexi met the Kunlun School's He Zudao and made a dying confession to He Zudao, telling him to inform the Shaolin School where the manual is. He Zudao misheard "The manual is in the ape" as "The manual is in the oil" and passed on the wrong message to others. The mystery of the whereabouts of the manual baffled martial artists in the jianghu for nearly a century. He Zudao also disappeared mysteriously after being defeated by Jueyuan in a fight.

The Heaven Sword and Dragon Saber

Jueyuan passes on his knowledge of the manual
Jueyuan is unable to recover the lost manual as the only people who know its whereabouts are either missing or dead and he returns to Shaolin Monastery after his futile attempt. However, Jueyuan had already read the entire text of the manual and had practised martial arts based on its principles before. He is unaware of the book's true value and cultivated strong inner energy from his practice. He imparts sections of the book he learnt to his apprentice Zhang Junbao. Zhang builds up a strong inner energy foundation, which later becomes useful when he proceeds to train in more advanced martial arts.

Three years later, a powerful martial artist travels to Shaolin to challenge the school and no one is able to defeat him. Jueyuan takes up the challenge and he defeats the aggressor. The Shaolin monks are surprised when they see Jueyuan, who has been forbidden by the school's rules to practise any form of martial arts, exhibit such powerful skills during the fight. According to Shaolin's regulations, Jueyuan must be put to death for violating the code. Zhang Junbao is also to be killed. Jueyuan expresses his willingness to accept the punishment and begs for Zhang's life to be spared but is denied.

At the critical moment, Jueyuan breaks loose and escapes with his apprentice. They run into Guo Xiang at the foot of Mount Song. Guo Xiang defends them from the pursuing Shaolin monks and they engage in a fierce battle. The three of them decide to retreat as they are no match for the full force of Shaolin and also because they do not wish to develop feuds with Shaolin. Jueyuan carries Zhang and Guo to safety but he overexerts himself and coughs blood later. Jueyuan is on the verge of death and he recites the text of the Nine Yang Manual from memory amidst the Lanvakatara Sutra and passes on soon after he finished reciting. Guo Xiang, Zhang Junbao and Wuse (a senior Shaolin monk) As the three of them have significant differences in their levels of understanding of martial arts, and Zhang Junbao having learnt it straight from Jueyuan had learnt more than the latter, while Wuse came on sight later and so each individual's interpretations of the verses vary.

The Shaolin, Wudang and Emei schools have their own versions of the Nine Yang Manual after Wuse, Zhang Junbao and Guo Xiang pass on their knowledge to their respective schools. As Guo has the best memory of the three of them, Emei's version is the longest. However, Shaolin's version is the most powerful because Wuse is superior to Guo and Zhang in martial arts prowess and he integrates the manual's skills with his own. As for Zhang, who spent the longest time with Jueyuan, he recalls the most original and purest version. The three simplified versions of the manual eventually become known as 'Shaolin Nine Yang Skill' (少林九陽功), 'Wudang Nine Yang Skill' (武當九陽功), and 'Emei Nine Yang Skill' (峨嵋九陽功).

The manual's influence on various schools
Zhang Junbao and Guo Xiang incorporate various principles of the Nine Yang Manual into their own martial arts and become more powerful martial artists as they grow older. Zhang Junbao (later renamed to "Zhang Sanfeng") and Guo Xiang founded the Wudang and Emei schools respectively decades later. Their skills are passed on to their disciples and later become infused into their schools' martial arts. Wuse returns to Shaolin and passes on his knowledge of the manual to his fellows. The book's skills find their way into the martial arts of three of the leading schools in the wulin (martial artists' community).

Despite the common belief that the Nine Yang Manual has Buddhist origins, Zhang Sanfeng begins to doubt this claim as he delves further into the text. He notices that the principles and philosophy of the skills depicted in the manual are very much Taoist in nature. He also points out that the manual was written in Chinese instead of Sanskrit, the language that the manual's alleged creator Bodhidharma would have used. Zhang develops the Taiji Fist based on the principles in the book.

Zhang Wuji finds the manual
No one had ever possessed the complete version of the Nine Yang Manual ever since it was stolen from Shaolin. Zhang Sanfeng, Guo Xiang and Wuse only grasped parts of the book from Jueyuan's incomplete recitation of the text. Zhang Wuji discovers the white gorilla by chance. He uses his medical knowledge to remove the book from the ape's abdomen, which was placed inside by Yinkexi after he stole it from Shaolin nearly a century ago. As Zhang had previously learned Wudang's simplified version of the manual, he is able to understand its content and spends five years mastering the skills in the book. He develops the Nine Yang Divine Skill (九陽神功) from his study and uses it to heal himself of his wounds caused by the Xuanming Elders' 'Xuanming Divine Palm'. Zhang later buries the manual, along with the books about medicine and toxicology (written by Hu Qingniu and Wang Nangu), in an unknown valley in the Kunlun Mountains. Zhang integrates his knowledge of the manual's skills with other martial arts he learnt and becomes a formidable martial artist.

References 

Condor Trilogy
Fictional books